The men's 110 metres hurdles hurdling event at the 1932 Summer Olympics took place on August 2 and August 3 at the Los Angeles Memorial Coliseum. Seventeen athletes from 10 nations competed. The 1930 Olympic Congress in Berlin had reduced the limit from 4 athletes per NOC to 3 athletes. The event was won by George Saling of the United States, the first in a streak of nine victories by the Americans (and the seventh overall gold medal for the United States in the 110 metres hurdles). It initially appeared that the Americans had swept the medals, but film review showed that Don Finlay had come in third over Jack Keller; this gave Great Britain its first medal in the event since 1896.

Background

This was the ninth appearance of the event, which is one of 12 athletics events to have been held at every Summer Olympics. None of the finalists from 1928 returned. Percy Beard and Jack Keller of the United States and Bengt Sjöstedt of Finland each had tied the world record before the Games.

For the first time, no nations made their debut in the 110 metres hurdles. The United States made its ninth appearance, the only nation to have competed in the 110 metres hurdles in each Games to that point.

Competition format

The competition used the three-round basic format introduced in 1908. The first round consisted of four heats, with between 3 and 6 hurdlers each. The top three hurdlers in each heat advanced to the semifinals. The 12 semifinalists were divided into two semifinals of 6 hurdlers each; the top three hurdlers in each advanced to the 6-man final.

Records

These were the standing world and Olympic records (in seconds) prior to the 1932 Summer Olympics.

Jack Keller broke the Olympic record in the first semifinal, setting a new time at 14.5 seconds. George Saling bettered it in the second semifinal, dropping the Olympic record to 14.4 seconds—equal to the world record.

Schedule

Results

Round 1

Four heats were held; the fastest three runners advanced to the semifinal round.

Heat 1

Heat 2

Heat 3

Heat 4

Semifinals

Two heats were held; the fastest three runners advanced to the final.

Semifinal 1

Semifinal 2

Mantikas was disqualified for knocking down three hurdles.

Final

References

Athletics at the 1932 Summer Olympics
Sprint hurdles at the Olympics
Men's events at the 1932 Summer Olympics